The women's 400 metres hurdles at the 1978 European Athletics Championships was held in Prague, then Czechoslovakia, at Stadion Evžena Rošického on 1 and 2 September 1978.

Medalists

Results

Final
2 September

Semi-finals
2 September

Semi-final 1

Semi-final 2

Heats
1 September

Heat 1

Heat 2

Heat 3

Heat 4

Participation
According to an unofficial count, 28 athletes from 17 countries participated in the event.

 (3)
 (1)
 (3)
 (3)
 (1)
 (1)
 (1)
 (1)
 (1)
 (2)
 (1)
 (3)
 (2)
 (1)
 (1)
 (1)
 (2)

References

400 metres hurdles
400 metres hurdles at the European Athletics Championships
1978 in women's athletics